Cerro Congolón or "Montaña Congolón" is a mountain located in the Lempira Department of Honduras, declared a National Historic Landmark of Honduras by the National Congress of Honduras in 2010.

References

Mountains of Honduras
Lempira Department